The 36th United States Congress was a meeting of the legislative branch of the United States federal government, consisting of the United States Senate and the United States House of Representatives. It met in Washington, D.C. from March 4, 1859, to March 4, 1861, during the third and fourth years of James Buchanan's presidency. The apportionment of seats in the House of Representatives was based on the 1850 United States census. The Senate had a Democratic majority, and the House had a Republican plurality.

Major events

 June 8, 1859: Comstock Lode discovered in the western Utah Territory (present-day Nevada)
 August 27, 1859: First oil well was drilled in the United States, near Titusville, Pennsylvania
 October 16–18, 1859: John Brown's raid on Harpers Ferry 
 December 2, 1859 John Brown executed.
 December 5, 1859 – February 1, 1860: The election for the House speakership takes 44 ballots
 April 3, 1860: Pony Express began its first run
 April 23 – May 3, 1860: Democratic National Convention held in Charleston, South Carolina. Unable to agree on a nominee, the delegates voted to reconvene in June. 
 May 9, 1860: Constitutional Union Party National Convention held in Baltimore, Maryland, nominating John Bell for president.
 May 18, 1860: Republican National Convention held in Chicago, Illinois, nominating Abraham Lincoln for president.
 June 18–23, 1860: Democratic Party reconvened in Baltimore, Maryland, nominating Stephen A. Douglas for president.
 June 26–28, 1860: Southern Democrats held a convention in Richmond, Virginia, nominating John C. Breckinridge for president.
 November 6, 1860: U.S. presidential election: Abraham Lincoln beat John C. Breckinridge, Stephen A. Douglas, and John Bell.
 December 20, 1860: South Carolina Secession Convention enacted an Ordinance of Secession
 January 3, 1861: Delaware Secession Convention voted not to secede from the Union
 January 9, 1861: Mississippi Secession Convention enacted an Ordinance of Secession
 January 10, 1861: Florida Secession Convention enacted an Ordinance of Secession
 January 11, 1861: Alabama Secession Convention enacted an Ordinance of Secession
 January 18, 1861: Georgia Secession Convention enacted an Ordinance of Secession
 January 26, 1861: Louisiana Secession Convention enacted an Ordinance of Secession 
 January 29, 1861. Kansas admitted to the Union as a free state. 
 February 1, 1861: Texas Secession Convention enacted an Ordinance of Secession
 February 13th, 1861: Joint Session of Congress certified the election of President Abraham Lincoln and Vice President Hannibal Hamlin.
 February 23, 1861: The people of Texas ratified its Ordinance of Secession President-elect Abraham Lincoln arrived secretly in Washington, D.C. after an alleged assassination plot in Baltimore, Maryland.

Major legislation

 June 16, 1860: Pacific Telegraph Act of 1860, ch. 147, 
 March 2, 1861: Morrill Tariff, ch. 68, 
 December 18, 1860 (introduced): Crittenden Compromise, rejected by the House of Representatives and the Senate

Constitutional amendments 
 March 2, 1861: Approved an amendment to the United States Constitution that would shield "domestic institutions" of the states (which in 1861 included slavery) from the constitutional amendment process and from abolition or interference by Congress, and submitted it to the state legislatures for ratification 
 This amendment, commonly known as the Corwin Amendment, has not been ratified and is still pending before the states.

Treaties 
 March 8, 1859: Quinault Treaty ratified, 
 March 8, 1859: Point No Point Treaty ratified,

States admitted and territories organized 
January 29, 1861: Kansas admitted as a state, ch. 20, 
February 28, 1861: Colorado Territory organized, ch. 59, 
March 2, 1861: Nevada Territory organized, ch. 83, 
March 2, 1861: Dakota Territory organized, ch. 86,

Party summary

Senate

House of Representatives

Leadership

Senate 
 President: John C. Breckinridge (D)
 President pro tempore: Benjamin Fitzpatrick (D), until February 26, 1860
 Jesse D. Bright (D), June 12–13, 1860
 Benjamin Fitzpatrick (D), June 26, 1860 – December 2, 1860
 Solomon Foot (R), elected February 16, 1861

House of Representatives 
 Speaker: William Pennington (R), elected February 1, 1860, after 44 rounds of balloting
 Democratic Caucus Chairman: George S. Houston

Members
This list is arranged by chamber, then by state. Senators are listed by class, and representatives are listed by district.

Skip to House of Representatives, below

Senate
Senators were elected by the state legislatures every two years, with one-third beginning new six-year terms with each Congress. Preceding the names in the list below are Senate class numbers, which indicate the cycle of their election. In this Congress, Class 1 meant their term began in the last Congress, requiring reelection in 1862; Class 2 meant their term began with this Congress, requiring reelection in 1864; and Class 3 meant their term ended with this Congress, requiring reelection in 1860.

Alabama 
 2. Clement C. Clay Jr. (D), until January 21, 1861
 3. Benjamin Fitzpatrick (D), until January 21, 1861

Arkansas 
 2. William K. Sebastian (D)
 3. Robert W. Johnson (D)

California 
 1. David C. Broderick (D), until September 16, 1859
 Henry P. Haun (D), November 3, 1859 – March 4, 1860
 Milton Latham (D), from March 5, 1860
 3. William M. Gwin (D)

Connecticut 
 1. James Dixon (R)
 3. Lafayette S. Foster (R)

Delaware 
 1. James A. Bayard Jr. (D)
 2. Willard Saulsbury Sr. (D)

Florida 
 1. Stephen Mallory (D), until January 21, 1861
 3. David Levy Yulee (D), until January 21, 1861

Georgia 
 2. Robert Toombs (D), until February 4, 1861
 3. Alfred Iverson Sr. (D), until January 28, 1861

Illinois 
 2. Stephen A. Douglas (D)
 3. Lyman Trumbull (R)

Indiana 
 1. Jesse D. Bright (D)
 3. Graham N. Fitch (D)

Iowa 
 2. James W. Grimes (R)
 3. James Harlan (R)

Kansas 
 2. Vacant from January 29, 1861 (newly admitted state)
 3. Vacant from January 29, 1861 (newly admitted state)

Kentucky 
 2. Lazarus W. Powell (D)
 3. John J. Crittenden (A)

Louisiana 
 2. Judah P. Benjamin (D), until February 4, 1861
 3. John Slidell (D), until February 4, 1861

Maine 
 1. Hannibal Hamlin (R), until January 17, 1861
 Lot M. Morrill (R), from January 17, 1861
 2. William Pitt Fessenden (R)

Maryland 
 1. Anthony Kennedy (A)
 3. James Pearce (D)

Massachusetts 
 1. Charles Sumner (R)
 2. Henry Wilson (R)

Michigan 
 1. Zachariah Chandler (R)
 2. Kinsley S. Bingham (R)

Minnesota 
 1. Henry M. Rice (D)
 2. Morton S. Wilkinson (R)

Mississippi 
 1. Jefferson Davis (D), until January 21, 1861
 2. Albert G. Brown (D), until January 12, 1861

Missouri 
 1. Trusten Polk (D)
 3. James S. Green (D)

New Hampshire 
 2. John P. Hale (R)
 3. Daniel Clark (R)

New Jersey 
 1. John R. Thomson (D)
 2. John C. Ten Eyck (R)

New York 
 1. Preston King (R)
 3. William H. Seward (R)

North Carolina 
 2. Thomas Bragg (D)
 3. Thomas L. Clingman (D)

Ohio 
 1. Benjamin Wade (R)
 3. George E. Pugh (D)

Oregon 
 2. Edward D. Baker (R), from October 2, 1860
 3. Joseph Lane (D)

Pennsylvania 
 1. Simon Cameron (R)
 3. William Bigler (D)

Rhode Island 
 1. James F. Simmons (R)
 2. Henry B. Anthony (R)

South Carolina 
 2. James Chesnut Jr. (D), until November 10, 1860
 3. James H. Hammond (D), until November 11, 1860

Tennessee 
 1. Andrew Johnson (D)
 2. Alfred O. P. Nicholson (D), until March 3, 1861

Texas 
 1. Matthias Ward (D), until December 5, 1859
 Louis Wigfall (D), from December 5, 1859
 2. John Hemphill (D)

Vermont 
 1. Solomon Foot (R)
 3. Jacob Collamer (R)

Virginia 
 1. James M. Mason (D)
 2. Robert M. T. Hunter (D)

Wisconsin 
 1. James R. Doolittle (R)
 3. Charles Durkee (R)

House of Representatives
The names of members of the House of Representatives are preceded by their district numbers.

Alabama 
 . James A. Stallworth (D), until January 21, 1861
 . James L. Pugh (D), until January 21, 1861
 . David Clopton (D), until January 21, 1861
 . Sydenham Moore (D), until January 21, 1861
 . George S. Houston (D), until January 21, 1861
 . Williamson R. W. Cobb (D), until January 30, 1861
 . Jabez L. M. Curry (D), until January 21, 1861

Arkansas 
 . Thomas C. Hindman (D)
 . Albert Rust (D)

California 
 . John C. Burch (D)
 . Charles L. Scott (D)

Connecticut 
 . Dwight Loomis (R)
 . John Woodruff (R)
 . Alfred A. Burnham (R)
 . Orris S. Ferry (R)

Delaware 
 . William G. Whiteley (D)

Florida 
 . George S. Hawkins (D), until January 21, 1861

Georgia 
 . Peter E. Love (D), until January 23, 1861
 . Martin J. Crawford (D), until January 23, 1861
 . Thomas Hardeman Jr. (O), until January 23, 1861
 . Lucius J. Gartrell (D), until January 23, 1861
 . John W. H. Underwood (D), until January 23, 1861
 . James Jackson (D), until January 23, 1861
 . Joshua Hill (O), until January 23, 1861
 . John J. Jones (D), until January 23, 1861

Illinois 
 . Elihu B. Washburne (R)
 . John F. Farnsworth (R)
 . Owen Lovejoy (R)
 . William Kellogg (R)
 . Isaac N. Morris (D)
 . John A. McClernand (D), from November 8, 1859
 . James C. Robinson (D)
 . Philip B. Fouke (D)
 . John A. Logan (D)

Indiana 
 . William E. Niblack (D)
 . William H. English (D)
 . William McKee Dunn (R)
 . William S. Holman (D)
 . David Kilgore (R)
 . Albert G. Porter (R)
 . John G. Davis (ALD)
 . James Wilson (R)
 . Schuyler Colfax (R)
 . Charles Case (R)
 . John U. Pettit (R)

Iowa 
 . Samuel Curtis (R)
 . William Vandever (R)

Kansas 
 . Martin F. Conway (R), from January 29, 1861 (newly admitted state)

Kentucky 
 . Henry C. Burnett (D)
 . Samuel O. Peyton (D)
 . Francis Bristow (O)
 . William C. Anderson (O)
 . John Y. Brown (D), from December 3, 1860
 . Green Adams (O)
 . Robert Mallory (O)
 . William E. Simms (D)
 . Laban T. Moore (O)
 . John W. Stevenson (D)

Louisiana 
 . John E. Bouligny (A)
 . Miles Taylor (D), until February 5, 1861
 . Thomas G. Davidson (D)
 . John M. Landrum (D)

Maine 
 . Daniel E. Somes (R)
 . John J. Perry (R)
 . Ezra B. French (R)
 . Freeman H. Morse (R)
 . Israel Washburn Jr. (R), until January 1, 1861
 Stephen Coburn (R), from January 2, 1861
 . Stephen C. Foster (R)

Maryland 
 . James A. Stewart (D)
 . Edwin H. Webster (A)
 . J. Morrison Harris (A)
 . Henry Winter Davis (A)
 . Jacob M. Kunkel (D)
 . George W. Hughes (D)

Massachusetts 
 . Thomas D. Eliot (R)
 . James Buffington (R)
 . Charles F. Adams Sr. (R)
 . Alexander H. Rice (R)
 . Anson Burlingame (R)
 . John B. Alley (R)
 . Daniel W. Gooch (R)
 . Charles R. Train (R)
 . Eli Thayer (R)
 . Charles Delano (R)
 . Henry L. Dawes (R)

Michigan 
 . George B. Cooper (D), until May 15, 1860
 William A. Howard (R), from May 15, 1860
 . Henry Waldron (R)
 . Francis W. Kellogg (R)
 . Dewitt C. Leach (R)

Minnesota 
Both representatives were elected statewide on a general ticket.(2 Republicans)
 . Cyrus Aldrich (R)
 . William Windom (R)

Mississippi 
 . Lucius Q. C. Lamar (D), until December 20, 1860
 . Reuben Davis (D), until January 12, 1861
 . William Barksdale (D), until January 12, 1861
 . Otho R. Singleton (D), until January 12, 1861
 . John J. McRae (D), until January 12, 1861

Missouri 
 . John R. Barret (D), until June 8, 1860
 Francis P. Blair Jr. (R), June 8, 1860 – June 25, 1860
 John R. Barret (D), from December 3, 1860
 . Thomas L. Anderson (ID)
 . John B. Clark (D)
 . James Craig (D)
 . Samuel H. Woodson (A)
 . John S. Phelps (D)
 . John W. Noell (D)

New Hampshire 
 . Gilman Marston (R)
 . Mason Tappan (R)
 . Thomas M. Edwards (R)

New Jersey 
 . John T. Nixon (R)
 . John L. N. Stratton (R)
 . Garnett Adrain (ALD)
 . Jetur R. Riggs (ALD)
 . William Pennington (R)

New York 
 . Luther C. Carter (R)
 . James Humphrey (R)
 . Daniel Sickles (D)
 . Thomas J. Barr (ID)
 . William B. Maclay (D)
 . John Cochrane (D)
 . George Briggs (R)
 . Horace F. Clark (ALD)
 . John B. Haskin (ALD)
 . Charles H. Van Wyck (R)
 . William S. Kenyon (R)
 . Charles L. Beale (R)
 . Abram B. Olin (R)
 . John H. Reynolds (ALD)
 . James B. McKean (R)
 . George W. Palmer (R)
 . Francis E. Spinner (R)
 . Clark B. Cochrane (R)
 . James H. Graham (R)
 . Roscoe Conkling (R)
 . R. Holland Duell (R)
 . M. Lindley Lee (R)
 . Charles B. Hoard (R)
 . Charles B. Sedgwick (R)
 . Martin Butterfield (R)
 . Emory B. Pottle (R)
 . Alfred Wells (R)
 . William Irvine (R)
 . Alfred Ely (R)
 . Augustus Frank (R)
 . Silas M. Burroughs (R), until June 3, 1860
 Edwin R. Reynolds (R), from December 5, 1860
 . Elbridge G. Spaulding (R)
 . Reuben Fenton (R)

North Carolina 
 . William N. H. Smith (O)
 . Thomas Ruffin (D)
 . Warren Winslow (D)
 . Lawrence O'Bryan Branch (D)
 . John Gilmer (O)
 . James M. Leach (O)
 . F. Burton Craige (D)
 . Zebulon Vance (O)

Ohio 
 . George H. Pendleton (D)
 . John A. Gurley (R)
 . Clement Vallandigham (D)
 . William Allen (D)
 . James M. Ashley (R)
 . William Howard (D)
 . Thomas Corwin (R)
 . Benjamin Stanton (R)
 . John Carey (R)
 . Carey A. Trimble (R)
 . Charles D. Martin (D)
 . Samuel S. Cox (D)
 . John Sherman (R)
 . Cyrus Spink (R), until May 31, 1859
 Harrison G. O. Blake (R), from October 11, 1859
 . William Helmick (R)
 . Cydnor B. Tompkins (R)
 . Thomas C. Theaker (R)
 . Sidney Edgerton (R)
 . Edward Wade (R)
 . John Hutchins (R)
 . John Bingham (R)

Oregon 
 . Lansing Stout (D)

Pennsylvania 
 . Thomas B. Florence (D)
 . Edward Joy Morris (R)
 . John P. Verree (R)
 . William Millward (R)
 . John Wood (R)
 . John Hickman (ALD)
 . Henry C. Longnecker (R)
 . John Schwartz (ALD), until June 20, 1860
 Jacob K. McKenty (D), from December 3, 1860
 . Thaddeus Stevens (R)
 . John W. Killinger (R)
 . James H. Campbell (R)
 . George W. Scranton (R)
 . William H. Dimmick (D)
 . Galusha A. Grow (R)
 . James T. Hale (R)
 . Benjamin F. Junkin (R)
 . Edward McPherson (R)
 . Samuel S. Blair (R)
 . John Covode (R)
 . William Montgomery (D)
 . James K. Moorhead (R)
 . Robert McKnight (R)
 . William Stewart (R)
 . Chapin Hall (R)
 . Elijah Babbitt (R)

Rhode Island 
 . Christopher Robinson (R)
 . William D. Brayton (R)

South Carolina 
 . John McQueen (D), until December 21, 1860
 . William P. Miles (D), until December 21, 1860
 . Laurence M. Keitt (D), until December 1860
 . Milledge L. Bonham (D), until December 21, 1860
 . John D. Ashmore (D), until December 21, 1860
 . William W. Boyce (D), until December 21, 1860

Tennessee 
 . Thomas A. R. Nelson (O)
 . Horace Maynard (O)
 . Reese B. Brabson (O)
 . William B. Stokes (O)
 . Robert H. Hatton (O)
 . James H. Thomas (D)
 . John V. Wright (D)
 . James M. Quarles (O)
 . Emerson Etheridge (O)
 . William T. Avery (D)

Texas 
 . John H. Reagan (D)
 . Andrew J. Hamilton (ID)

Vermont 
 . Eliakim P. Walton (R)
 . Justin S. Morrill (R)
 . Homer E. Royce (R)

Virginia 
 . Muscoe R. H. Garnett (D)
 . John S. Millson (D)
 . Daniel C. De Jarnette (ID)
 . William Goode (D), until July 3, 1859
 Roger A. Pryor (D), from December 7, 1859
 . Thomas S. Bocock (D)
 . Shelton Leake (ID)
 . William Smith (D)
 . Alexander Boteler (O)
 . John T. Harris (ID)
 . Sherrard Clemens (D)
 . Albert G. Jenkins (D)
 . Henry A. Edmundson (D)
 . Elbert S. Martin (ID)

Wisconsin 
 . John F. Potter (R)
 . Cadwallader C. Washburn (R)
 . Charles H. Larrabee (D)

Non-voting members 
 . Marcus J. Parrott (R), until January 29, 1861
 . Experience Estabrook, until May 18, 1860
Samuel G. Daily (R), from May 18, 1860
 . Miguel A. Otero (D)
 . William H. Hooper (D)
 . Isaac Stevens (D)

Changes in membership 
The count below reflects changes from the beginning of the first session of this Congress.

Senate 

 Replacements: 4
 Democrats (D): no net change
 Republicans (R): no net change
 Deaths: 1
 Resignations: 1
 Interim appointments: 1
 Withdrawals: 13
 Total seats with changes: 16

|-
| Oregon(2)
| Vacant
| Successor elected late due to legislature's failure to elect.
|  | Edward D. Baker (R)
| October 2, 1860

|-
| California(1)
|  | David C. Broderick (D)
| Died September 16, 1859, after taking part in a duel he participated in, which he was unlucky.Interim successor was appointed to continue the term.
|  | Henry P. Haun (D)
| November 3, 1859

|-
| Texas(1)
|  | Matthias Ward (D)
| Interim appointee lost nomination to finish the termSuccessor elected December 5, 1859.
|  | Louis Wigfall (D)
| December 5, 1859

|-
| California(1)
|  | Henry P. Haun (D)
| Interim appointee lost election to finish the termSuccessor elected March 5, 1860.
|  | Milton Latham (D)
| March 5, 1860

|-
| South Carolina(2)
|  | James Chesnut Jr. (D)
| Withdrew November 10, 1860.
| Vacant
| Not filled this Congress

|-
| South Carolina(3)
|  | James H. Hammond (D)
| Withdrew November 11, 1860.
| Vacant
| Not filled this Congress

|-
| Mississippi(2)
|  | Albert G. Brown (D)
| Withdrew January 12, 1861.
| Vacant
| Not filled this Congress

|-
| Maine(1)
|  | Hannibal Hamlin (R)
| Resigned January 17, 1861, to become Vice President of the United States.Successor elected January 17, 1861.
|  | Lot M. Morrill (R)
| January 17, 1861

|-
| Alabama(3)
|  | Benjamin Fitzpatrick (D)
| Withdrew January 21, 1861.
| Vacant
| Not filled this Congress

|-
| Alabama(2)
|  | Clement C. Clay (D)
| Withdrew January 21, 1861.
| Vacant
| Not filled this Congress

|-
| Florida(1)
|  | Stephen Mallory (D)
| Withdrew January 21, 1861.
| Vacant
| Not filled this Congress

|-
| Florida(3)
|  | David L. Yulee (D)
| Withdrew January 21, 1861.
| Vacant
| Not filled this Congress

|-
| Mississippi(1)
|  | Jefferson Davis (D)
| Withdrew January 21, 1861.
| Vacant
| Not filled this Congress

|-
| Georgia(3)
|  | Alfred Iverson Sr. (D)
| Withdrew January 28, 1861.
| Vacant
| Not filled this Congress

|-
| Kansas(2)
| New seat
| New state admitted to the Union January 29, 1861Senator was not elected until the next Congress.
| Vacant
| Not filled this Congress

|-
| Kansas(3)
| New seat
| New state admitted to the Union January 29, 1861Senator was not elected until the next Congress.
| Vacant
| Not filled this Congress

|-
| Georgia(2)
|  | Robert Toombs (D)
| Withdrew February 4, 1861.
| Vacant
| Not filled this Congress

|-
| Louisiana(2)
|  | Judah P. Benjamin (D)
| Withdrew February 4, 1861.
| Vacant
| Not filled this Congress

|-
| Louisiana(3)
|  | John Slidell (D)
| Withdrew February 4, 1861.
| Vacant
| Not filled this Congress

|-
| Tennessee(2)
|  | Alfred O. P. Nicholson (D)
| Withdrew March 3, 1861.
| Vacant
| Not filled this Congress
|}

House of Representatives 
 Replacements: 7
 Democrats (D): no net change
 Republicans (R): 1 seat net loss
 Anti-Lecompton Democrats (LD): 1 seat net gain
 Deaths: 4
 Resignations: 3
 Contested election: 1
 Withdrawals: 28
 Total seats with changes: 41

|-
| 
| Vacant
| style="font-size:80%" | Vacancy in term
|  | John A. McClernand (D)
| Seated November 8, 1859
|-
| 
| Vacant
| style="font-size:80%" | Brown could not take seat because he had not yet attained age required by the US Constitution
|  | John Y. Brown (D)
| Seated December 3, 1860
|-
| 
|  | Cyrus Spink (R)
| style="font-size:80%" | Died May 31, 1859
|  | Harrison G. O. Blake (R)
| Seated October 11, 1859
|-
| 
|  | William Goode (D)
| style="font-size:80%" | Died July 3, 1859
|  | Roger A. Pryor (D)
| Seated December 7, 1859
|-
| 
|  | George B. Cooper (D)
| style="font-size:80%" | Lost contested election May 15, 1860
|  | Francis P. Blair Jr. (R)
| Seated May 15, 1860
|-
| 
| Experience Estabrook
| style="font-size:80%" | Lost contested election May 18, 1860
|  | Samuel G. Daily (R)
| Seated May 18, 1860
|-
| 
|  | Silas M. Burroughs (R)
| style="font-size:80%" | Died June 3, 1860
|  | Edwin R. Reynolds (R)
| Seated December 5, 1860
|-
| 
|  | John R. Barret (D)
| style="font-size:80%" | Lost contested election June 8, 1860
|  | William A. Howard (R)
| Seated June 8, 1860
|-
| 
|  | John Schwartz (ALD)
| style="font-size:80%" | Died June 20, 1860
|  | Jacob K. McKenty (D)
| Seated December 3, 1860
|-
| 
|  | William A. Howard (R)
| style="font-size:80%" | Resigned June 25, 1860
|  | John R. Barret (D)
| Seated December 3, 1860
|-
| 
|  | Lucius Q. C. Lamar II (D)
| style="font-size:80%" | Retired December ???, 1860
| Vacant
| Not filled this term
|-
| 
|  | Laurence M. Keitt (D)
| style="font-size:80%" | Retired December ???, 1860
| Vacant
| Not filled this term
|-
| 
|  | John McQueen (D)
| style="font-size:80%" | Retired December 21, 1860
| Vacant
| Not filled this term
|-
| 
|  | William P. Miles (D)
| style="font-size:80%" | Retired December 21, 1860
| Vacant
| Not filled this term
|-
| 
|  | Milledge L. Bonham (D)
| style="font-size:80%" | Retired December 21, 1860
| Vacant
| Not filled this term
|-
| 
|  | John D. Ashmore (D)
| style="font-size:80%" | Retired December 21, 1860
| Vacant
| Not filled this term
|-
| 
|  | William W. Boyce (D)
| style="font-size:80%" | Retired December 21, 1860
| Vacant
| Not filled this term
|-
| 
|  | Israel Washburn Jr. (R)
| style="font-size:80%" | Resigned January 1, 1861, after being elected Governor of Maine
|  | Stephen Coburn (R)
| Seated January 2, 1861
|-
| 
|  | Reuben Davis (D)
| style="font-size:80%" | Withdrew January 12, 1861
| Vacant
| Not filled this term
|-
| 
|  | William Barksdale (D)
| style="font-size:80%" | Withdrew January 12, 1861
| Vacant
| Not filled this term
|-
| 
|  | Otho R. Singleton (D)
| style="font-size:80%" | Withdrew January 12, 1861
| Vacant
| Not filled this term
|-
| 
|  | John J. McRae (D)
| style="font-size:80%" | Withdrew January 12, 1861
| Vacant
| Not filled this term
|-
| 
|  | James A. Stallworth (D)
| style="font-size:80%" | Withdrew January 21, 1861
| Vacant
| Not filled this term
|-
| 
|  | James L. Pugh (D)
| style="font-size:80%" | Withdrew January 21, 1861
| Vacant
| Not filled this term
|-
| 
|  | David Clopton (D)
| style="font-size:80%" | Withdrew January 21, 1861
| Vacant
| Not filled this term
|-
| 
|  | Sydenham Moore (D)
| style="font-size:80%" | Withdrew January 21, 1861
| Vacant
| Not filled this term
|-
| 
|  | George S. Houston (D)
| style="font-size:80%" | Withdrew January 21, 1861
| Vacant
| Not filled this term
|-
| 
|  | Jabez L. M. Curry (D)
| style="font-size:80%" | Withdrew January 21, 1861
| Vacant
| Not filled this term
|-
| 
|  | George S. Hawkins (D)
| style="font-size:80%" | Withdrew January 21, 1861
| Vacant
| Not filled this term
|-
| 
|  | Peter E. Love (D)
| style="font-size:80%" | Retired January 23, 1861
| Vacant
| Not filled this term
|-
| 
|  | Martin J. Crawford (D)
| style="font-size:80%" | Withdrew January 23, 1861
| Vacant
| Not filled this term
|-
| 
|  | Thomas Hardeman Jr. (O)
| style="font-size:80%" | Withdrew January 23, 1861
| Vacant
| Not filled this term
|-
| 
|  | Lucius J. Gartrell (D)
| style="font-size:80%" | Retired January 23, 1861
| Vacant
| Not filled this term
|-
| 
|  | John W. H. Underwood (D)
| style="font-size:80%" | Withdrew January 23, 1861
| Vacant
| Not filled this term
|-
| 
|  | James Jackson (D)
| style="font-size:80%" | Retired January 23, 1861
| Vacant
| Not filled this term
|-
| 
|  | Joshua Hill (O)
| style="font-size:80%" | Resigned January 23, 1861
| Vacant
| Not filled this term
|-
| 
|  | John J. Jones (D)
| style="font-size:80%" | Withdrew January 23, 1861
| Vacant
| Not filled this term
|-
| 
|  | Marcus J. Parrott (R)
| style="font-size:80%" | Kansas was admitted to the Union January 29, 1861
| colspan=2 | Seat eliminated
|-
| 
| New Seat
| style="font-size:80%" | Kansas was admitted to the Union January 29, 1861
|  | Martin F. Conway (R)
| Seated January 29, 1861
|-
| 
|  | Williamson R. W. Cobb (D)
| style="font-size:80%" | Withdrew January 30, 1861
| Vacant
| Not filled this term
|-
| 
|  | Miles Taylor (D)
| style="font-size:80%" | Withdrew February 5, 1861
| Vacant
| Not filled this term
|}

Committees
Lists of committees and their party leaders.

Senate

 Alter and Improve Senate Chamber (Select)
 Amendments to the Constitution (Select)
 Audit and Control the Contingent Expenses of the Senate (Chairman: Andrew Johnson)
 Banks of the District of Columbia (Select)
 Circulation of Bank Notes in the District of Columbia (Select)
 Claims (Chairman: Alfred Iverson Jr.)
 Commerce (Chairman: Clement Claiborne Clay)
 Comptroller William Medill (Select)
 Distributing Public Revenue Among the States (Select)
 District of Columbia (Chairman: Albert G. Brown)
 Duties of Imports (Select)
 Finance (Chairman: Robert M. T. Hunter)
 Foreign Relations (Chairman: James M. Mason)
 French Spoilations (Select)
 Harpers Ferry Invasion (Select)
 Indian Affairs (Chairman: William K. Sebastian)
 Judiciary (Chairman: James A. Bayard Jr.)
 Memorial of Houmas Lands Settlers (Select)
 Military Affairs (Chairman: Jefferson Davis)
 Naval Affairs (Chairman: Stephen Mallory)
 Ordnance and War Ships (Select)
 Pacific Railroad (Select)
 Patents and the Patent Office (Chairman: William Bigler)
 Pensions (Chairman: N/A)
 Post Office and Post Roads (Chairman: N/A)
 Printing (Chairman: N/A)
 Public Printing Investigation (Select)
 Private Land Claims (Chairman: N/A)
 Public Lands (Chairman: Robert W. Johnson)
 Retrenchment (Chairman: N/A)
 Revolutionary Claims (Chairman: N/A)
 Tariff Regulation (Select)
 Territories (Chairman: N/A)
 Thirteen on the Disturbed Condition of the Country (Select)
 Whole

House of Representatives

 Accounts (Chairman: Francis E. Spinner)
 Agriculture (Chairman: Martin Butterfield)
 Claims (Chairman: John Hickman)
 Commerce (Chairman: Elihu B. Washburne)
 District of Columbia (Chairman: Luther C. Carter)
 Elections (Chairman: John A. Gilmer) 
 Engraving (Chairman: Garnett B. Adrain)
 Expenditures in the Interior Department (Chairman: N/A)
 Expenditures in the Navy Department (Chairman: Robert Hatton)
 Expenditures in the Post Office Department (Chairman: George W. Palmer) 
 Expenditures in the State Department (Chairman: James B. McKean)
 Expenditures in the Treasury Department (Chairman: Dwight Loomis)
 Expenditures in the War Department (Chairman: William Stewart)
 Expenditures on Public Buildings (Chairman: William D. Brayton)
 Foreign Affairs (Chairman: Thomas Corwin)
 Indian Affairs (Chairman: Emerson Etheridge)
 Invalid Pensions (Chairman: Reuben E. Fenton)
 Judiciary (Chairman: John Hickman) 
 Manufactures (Chairman: Charles F. Adams)
 Mileage (Chairman: John D. Ashmore)
 Military Affairs (Chairman: Benjamin Stanton)
 Militia (Chairman: Cydnor B. Tompkins)
 Naval Affairs (Chairman: Freeman H. Morse)
 Patents (Chairman: William Millward)
 Post Office and Post Roads (Chairman: Schuyler Colfax)
 Private Land Claims (Chairman: Cadwallader C. Washburn)
 Public Buildings and Grounds (Chairman: Charles R. Train)
 Public Expenditures (Chairman: John B. Haskin)
 Public Lands (Chairman: Eli Thayer)
 Revisal and Unfinished Business (Chairman: John A. Logan)
 Revolutionary Claims (Chairman: George N. Briggs)
 Revolutionary Pensions (Chairman: John F. Potter)
 Roads and Canals (Chairman: Robert Mallory)
 Rules (Select)
 Standards of Official Conduct
 Territories (Chairman: Galusha A. Grow) 
 Ways and Means (Chairman: John Sherman)
 Whole

Joint committees

 Enrolled Bills (Chairman: Sen. Henry Haun then Sen. Willard Saulsbury Sr.)
 The Library (Chairman: Rep. John U. Pettit)
 Printing (Chairman: Rep. John A. Gurley)
 Making Arrangements for Inaugurating Washington's Statue

Caucuses 
 Democratic (House)
 Democratic (Senate)

Employees

Legislative branch agency directors 
 Architect of the Capitol: Thomas U. Walter
 Librarian of Congress: John Silva Meehan

Senate 
 Chaplain: Stephen P. Hill (Baptist), until December 15, 1859
 Phineas D. Gurley (Presbyterian), elected December 15, 1859
 Secretary: Asbury Dickins
 Sergeant at Arms: Dunning R. McNair

House of Representatives 
 Clerk: James C. Allen, until February 3, 1860
 John W. Forney, elected February 3, 1860
 Chaplain: None
 Doorkeeper: Robert B. Hackney, until February 6, 1860
 George Marston, elected February 6, 1860
 Messenger: Thaddeus Morrice
 Postmaster: Josiah M. Lucas
 Reading Clerks: 
 Sergeant at Arms: Adam J. Glossbrenner, until February 3, 1860
 Henry William Hoffman, from February 3, 1860

See also 
 1858 United States elections (elections leading to this Congress)
 1858–59 United States Senate elections
 1858–59 United States House of Representatives elections
 1860 United States elections (elections during this Congress, leading to the next Congress)
 1860 United States presidential election
 1860–61 United States Senate elections
 1860–61 United States House of Representatives elections

Notes

References

References
 
 
  Alt URL

External links
 Statutes at Large, 1789-1875
 Senate Journal, First Forty-three Sessions of Congress
 House Journal, First Forty-three Sessions of Congress
 Biographical Directory of the U.S. Congress
 U.S. House of Representatives: House History
 U.S. Senate: Statistics and Lists